Admiral Taylor may refer to:

Bertram Taylor (Royal Navy officer) (1906–1970), British Royal Navy rear admiral
David W. Taylor (1864–1940), U.S. Navy rear admiral
Edmund B. Taylor (1904–1973), U.S. Navy vice admiral
Ernest Taylor (Royal Navy officer) (1876–1971), British Royal Navy vice admiral
Henry Clay Taylor (1845–1904), U.S. Navy rear admiral
James E. Taylor (born 1935), U.S. Navy rear admiral
William Taylor (Royal Navy officer, born 1760) (died 1842), British Royal Navy admiral
William Rogers Taylor (1811–1889), U.S. Navy rear admiral
Montgomery M. Taylor (1869–1952), U.S. Navy admiral
Rodney Taylor (1940–2002), Royal Australian Navy vice admiral
Rufus Taylor (1910–1978), U.S. Navy vice admiral

See also
Joseph Needham Tayler (1783–1864), British Royal Navy vice admiral